Mumsnet is a London-based internet forum, created in 2000 by Justine Roberts for discussion between parents of children and teenagers.

History and finances 
Mumsnet was created in 2000 by Justine Roberts, who came up with the idea of a website to help parents pool information and advice, following a disastrous first family holiday with her one-year-old twins. Roberts persuaded friends Carrie Longton and Steven Cassidy to help her build the site.

The website grew to become one of the most influential online forums for parents; in November 2009, then–Prime Minister Gordon Brown, opposition leader David Cameron and many other leading UK government ministers took part in live webchats with Mumsnet users. In March 2010 Mumsnet's 10th birthday party was hosted by Google UK at their London headquarters. Guests included Ed Miliband and Steve Hilton, and both then-Prime Minister Gordon Brown and his wife Sarah Brown gave speeches. Gordon Brown referred to Mumsnet as a "great British institution".

In May 2011, Roberts founded Gransnet, a sister site to Mumsnet for users over 50.

Roberts, the CEO, was named in The Guardians 2010 Power 100. In February 2013, Roberts and co-founder Longton were assessed as the 7th most powerful women in the United Kingdom by Woman's Hour on BBC Radio 4. Roberts was appointed Commander of the Order of the British Empire (CBE) in the 2017 New Year Honours, for services to the economy.

In 2018, Mumsnet had 1.3 billion page views from 119 million unique users, and a revenue of £8.6 million.

In April 2020, Mumsnet announced a premium membership option.

Media 
In November 2009, several political leaders held live chats on Mumsnet in advance of the 2010 United Kingdom general election, in part due to the website's primary demographic being regarded by politicians as key floating voters, with online forums seen as arenas in which their votes could be courted. Then-Prime Minister, Gordon Brown, and the leader of the opposition, David Cameron, both appeared on the website's webchats in quick succession, an event that was highly publicised. Conservative commentator Toby Young, in arguing that Mumsnet users constituted a minor and insignificant demographic, commented that the website's users were "Guardian-reading, laptop-wielding harpies", and that the website was "peopled exclusively by university-educated, upper-middle-class women who are only "swing voters" in the sense that they swing between voting Labour, Lib Dem and Green".

Sponsored content
As well as selling traditional advertising spaces on the website, Mumsnet also hosts sponsored discussion threads that act as product placements. These sponsored threads take the form of sponsored Q&A threads relevant to the products being marketed, or of "product tests", where site users are offered free samples in exchange for feedback.

In 2010, the Advertising Standards Authority extended its Code of Advertising Practice to include a requirement that paid-for promotional content on social media should be clearly identifiable as an advertisement. In response to this, Mumsnet began to mark product placement discussion threads as "sponsored threads"; during the website's first 10 years, no systematic distinction existed for users to discern between paid-for discussions and user-generated discussions.

Webchats 
The site has hosted webchats with celebrities and politicians. Then-Prime Minister David Cameron was challenged over the provision of free nappies for disabled children, and in 2011, UKIP leader Nigel Farage told Mumsnet users that UKIP MEP Godfrey Bloom was "100% right" in stating that "no self-respecting small businessman with a brain in the right place would ever employ a lady of child-bearing age." In 2019, Jeremy Corbyn and John McDonnell have both faced questions about the Labour Party's Brexit policy and inter-party issues of anti-semitism.

Jamie Oliver, Dawn French, Gok Wan and Clare Balding have all also taken part in Mumsnet webchats. Hillary Clinton also did a video Q&A in 2014.

Mumsnet books 
Mumsnet has published several parenting books, based largely on the advice posted by the site's users since its launch in June 2000. These are Pregnancy: The Mumsnet Guide (2009), Toddlers: The Mumsnet Guide (2009) and Babies: The Mumsnet Guide (2010). The website's latest parenting guide, The Mumsnet Rules, was published in 2011.

Other publications include a cookbook titled Top Bananas!: The Best Ever Family Recipes from Mumsnet (2014), The Book of Bedtime Stories (2013) and How to Blitz Nits and Other Nasties (2017).

Lawsuit 
In April 2006, lawyers acting for "childcare guru" and former maternity nurse Gina Ford contacted Mumsnet in response to bulletin discussions of Ford's parenting methods, in which users had advocated for personal attacks to be made on Ford and her family. Ford's lawyers claimed that these threads constituted libel, and requested immediate removal of the posts in question. After 12 months of discussion, Mumsnet settled the dispute by apologising publicly to Ford and making a contribution to her legal costs.

In November 2010, Mumsnet co-founder Justine Roberts wrote to Prime Minister David Cameron, urging reform of the draft Defamation Bill to address the rise of online publication.

Campaigns 
Mumsnet has initiated several national campaigns, and has publicly supported a number of causes related to parenting. Both the 'Let Toys Be Toys' and 'Let Books Be Books' campaigns had their roots in discussions held on Mumsnet.

In response to forum users' experience with care and support in the National Health Service for miscarried pregnancies, Mumsnet launched its 'Campaign for Better Miscarriage Care'; the campaign proposed a series of recommendations for improving how parents affected by miscarriage were treated within the NHS, detailed in the Mumsnet Miscarriage Code of Care, which was drawn up in consultation with its users.

In January 2010, the site launched its 'Let Girls Be Girls' campaign. The campaign challenged retailers to ensure that they did not contribute to the premature sexualisation of children through their products and marketing. In December 2010, Let Girls Be Girls was extended, calling for an end to the display of 'Lads' Mags' in the view of children in supermarkets and stores. The campaign received the support of the main UK magazine retailers, with the exception of WHSmith.

In January 2011, Riven Vincent, a regular Mumsnet user with a severely disabled child, received widespread media attention after posting on the site about her despair in the face of local budget cuts. In response to Vincent's plight, Mumsnet launched its 'Respite Care' campaign, which called on local authorities to provide adequate short breaks for families with disabled children.

In June 2013, the site launched a campaign to end sales representatives on maternity wards, following numerous complaints of bad practice and a user survey in which 82% of respondents found it unacceptable for commercial companies to access new mothers on hospital wards. The campaign called on members to write to their local NHS Trusts and MPs, as well as to share their stories of run-ins with sales reps. In response, a number of NHS Trusts across the UK cancelled or revised their contracts with commercial companies, with over 75 MPs signing an Early Day Motion calling for a ban on sales reps in wards.

In August 2013, the site launched the awareness-raising campaign 'This Is My Child', which aimed to support parents of children with additional needs in raising awareness of how the general public could help make the lives of those caring for children with additional needs easier. The site produced a myth-busting guide to additional needs for the public, supporting material produced by its users and partner organisations (Mencap, Contact a Family and Every Disabled Child Matters), and hosted a series of blogs and webchats on parenting a child with additional needs.

In May 2017, the site launched a new campaign called 'Better Postnatal Care: Aftercare, not Afterthought', which aimed to address major failings in the postnatal care system found in their 2017 survey.

Criticism
The forum has been portrayed in the media as being populated by pushy and anxious mothers, including on TV comedy shows such as Outnumbered and Bad Education.

In 2018, Catriona Jones of the University of Hull alleged that websites such as Mumsnet, which focused on graphic and negative accounts of childbirth, had led to a rise in tokophobia (fear of childbirth) in Britain.

Fathers4Justice 
In March 2012, Fathers4Justice launched a campaign highlighting Mumsnet's alleged agenda of misandry. The campaign included a naked protest at Marks and Spencer, one of Mumsnet's advertisers, with the protestors stating it was an attempt to draw attention to the "naked truth" that Mumsnet promoted gender hatred. Fathers4Justice activist Matt O'Connor stated that "When you look at the language being used in some of these forums, you can see how unacceptable it would be if it was aimed towards other races or sexualities, but it seems to be widely accepted against men."

Transgender issues 

The site has been criticized on the grounds it hosts transphobic content. In 2018, Mumsnet introduced new rules regarding discussion of transgender issues after controversy surrounding allegations of allowing transphobic discussion, a move which was seen as a positive by LGBT activists, but faced criticism for restricting use of the terms 'cisgender' and 'TERF'. Eve Livingston, writing for Vice, described the forum as a "toxic hotbed of transphobia". Edie Miller, writing for The Outline in 2018, stated that "Mumsnet is to British transphobia more like what 4chan is to American fascism. The tendencies were already there, but a messageboard to amplify them and recruit people to the cause never hurts."

In October 2019, Upfield, the makers of Flora margarine, withdrew from a "Mumsnet rated" promotional agreement after campaigners drew attention to alleged transphobic content on the site.

References

Further reading

External links 
 

British women's websites
Discrimination against LGBT people
Feminism and transgender
Internet forums
Internet properties established in 2000
Internet-related controversies
Parenting websites